Sofja Ņesterova (born 6 August 2001) is a Latvian footballer who plays as a goalkeeper for Sieviešu Futbola Līga club Rīgas FS and the Latvia women's national team.

References

2001 births
Living people
Latvian women's footballers
Women's association football goalkeepers
Rīgas FS players
Latvia women's youth international footballers
Latvia women's international footballers